Ionian mode is a musical mode or, in modern usage, a diatonic scale also called the major scale.

It is the name assigned by Heinrich Glarean in 1547 to his new authentic mode on C (mode 11 in his numbering scheme), which uses the diatonic octave species from C to the C an octave higher, divided at G (as its dominant, reciting tone/reciting note or tenor) into a fourth species of perfect fifth (tone–tone–semitone–tone) plus a third species of perfect fourth (tone–tone–semitone): C D E F G + G A B C. This octave species is essentially the same as the major mode of tonal music.

Church music had been explained by theorists as being organised in eight musical modes: the scales on D, E, F, and G in the "greater perfect system" of "musica recta," each with their authentic and plagal counterparts.

Glarean's twelfth mode was the plagal version of the Ionian mode, called Hypoionian (under Ionian), based on the same relative scale, but with the major third as its tenor, and having a melodic range from a perfect fourth below the tonic, to a perfect fifth above it.

See also
Bilawal, the equivalent scale (thaat) in Hindustani music
Shankarabharanam, the equivalent scale (melakarta) in Carnatic music

Notes

References

External links
 Ionian mode for guitar at GOSK.com

Modes (music)
Diatonic set theory
Major scales